Mashui (Chinese: 马水) is a township in Leiyang, Hunan province.

it includes Pingtian (Chinese: 坪田) village where there's a Chenjia Wan(Chinese: 陈家湾) .

External links
Official website of Mashui Government

Leiyang
Townships of Hunan